Enric Guitart i Matas (Barcelona, 1 May 1909 – 30 November 1999), better known as simply Enric Guitart, or Enrique Guitart in Spanish circles, was a Catalan and Spanish stage and film actor. He appeared in around forty films during his career. He was the son of the actor and theater director, Enric Guitart i Soldevila, and the actress Emília Matas. He portrayed Don Joaquín in the play La sirena varada, written by Alejandro Casona and released at the Teatro Español on 17 March 1934.

Selected filmography
The following are only some of the Catalan and Spanish films in which Enric Guitart acted.

{| class="wikitable plainrowheaders sortable" style="margin-right: 0;"
|-
! scope="col" | Year
! scope="col" | Original film title (& English title, where there is one)
! scope="col" style="width: 11em;"| Role played
! scope="col" | Director(s)
! scope="col" | Notes
! scope="col" class="unsortable" | 
|-
! scope=row | 1929
| La Marieta de l’ull viu, o Baixant de la font del Gat
| 
| 
| 
|
|-
! scope=row | 1930
| L'auca del senyor Esteve
| 
| 
|
|
|-
! scope=row | 1934
| El novio de mamá
| 
| 
| 
|
|-
! scope=row | 1936 
| El bailarín y el trabajador (The Dancer and the Worker)
| 
| 
| 
|
|-
! scope=row | 1937-38
| ¡No quiero... no quiero!| 
| 
| 
|
|-
! scope=row | 1940
| Julieta y Romeo (Juliet and Romeo)
| 
| 
| 
|
|-
! scope=row | 1940
| ¡Rápteme usted!| 
| 
| 
|
|-
! scope=row | 1941
| Su hermano y él| 
| 
| 
|
|-
! scope=row | 1942 
| Siempre mujeres 
| 
| 
| 
|
|-
! scope=row | 1942 
| Vidas cruzadas| 
| 
| 
|
|-
! scope=row | 1945
| Leyenda de feria| 
| 
| 
|
|-
! scope=row | 1946
| Senda ignorada (Unknown Path)
| 
| 
| 
|
|-
! scope=row | 1947 
| Vidas confusas| 
| 
| 
|
|-
! scope=row | 1948 
| El marqués de Salamanca| 
| 
| 
|
|-
! scope=row | 1949 
| La mies es mucha 
| 
| 
| 
|Guitart, Enric at MCN Biografías, la web de las biografías, www.mcnbiografias.com.  [Accessed: 25-10-2019].
|-
! scope=row | 1949 
| Noventa minutos (Ninety Minutes)
| 
| 
| 
|
|-
! scope=row | 1950 
| Don Juan| 
| 
| 
|
|-
! scope=row | 1950
| El hijo de la noche (Child of the Night)
| 
| 
| 
|
|-
! scope=row | 1951
| El sueño de Andalucía / Andalousie (The Dream of Andalusia)| 
| 
| 
|
|-
! scope=row | 1951
| Servicio en la mar (Service at Sea)
| 
| 
| 
|
|-
! scope=row | 1953
| Intriga en el escenario (Plot on the Stage)
| 
| 
| 
|
|-
! scope=row | 1953
| Hermano menor (Younger Brother)
| 
| 
| 
|
|-
! scope=row | 1961
| Los atracadores| 
| 
| 
|
|-
! scope=row | 1967
| Operación Dalila| 
| 
| 
|
|}

 References 

 Bibliography 
 Wright, Sarah. Tales of Seduction: The Figure of Don Juan in Spanish Culture''.  I.B.Tauris, 2012.

External links 
 

1909 births
1999 deaths
Spanish male film actors
Male actors from Catalonia
People from Barcelona
20th-century Spanish male actors